The 2021 European Wrestling Olympic Qualification Tournament is the second regional qualifying tournament for the 2020 Summer Olympics. The event was held from 18 to 21 March 2021, in BOK Sports Hall, Budapest, Hungary.

Qualification summary 
A total of 36 athletes secured a spot in the 2020 Summer Olympics, in Tokyo, Japan. Two spots were given to each of the weight classes in every event. This allows a total of 12 available spots for each event. Every winner and runner-up per class were awarded their place for wrestling, at the 2020 Summer Olympics. Quota places are allocated to the respective NOC and not to competitor that achieved the place in the qualification event.

Men's freestyle

57 kg
18–19 March

65 kg 
18–19 March

74 kg 
18–19 March

86 kg 
18–19 March

97 kg 
18–19 March

125 kg 
18–19 March

Men's Greco-Roman

60 kg
20–21 March

67 kg
20–21 March

77 kg
20–21 March

87 kg
20–21 March

97 kg
20–21 March

130 kg
20–21 March

Women's freestyle

50 kg
19–20 March

53 kg
19–20 March

57 kg
19–20 March

62 kg
19–20 March

68 kg
19–20 March

76 kg
19–20 March

See also 
2020 Pan American Wrestling Olympic Qualification Tournament
2021 African & Oceania Wrestling Olympic Qualification Tournament
2021 Asian Wrestling Olympic Qualification Tournament
2021 World Wrestling Olympic Qualification Tournament

References

External links
United World Wrestling - European OG Qualifier

Qualification Europe
Olympic Q Europe
European Wrestling Olympic Qualification Tournament
European Wrestling Olympic Qualification Tournament
International wrestling competitions hosted by Hungary
International sports competitions in Budapest